Northern Superchargers are a franchise 100-ball cricket side based in the city of Leeds. The team represents the traditional areas of North East and Yorkshire in The Hundred competition, which first took place during the 2021 English and Welsh cricket season. Both the men's and women's side will play their home match at Headingley.

History 

The announcement of the new eight-team men's and women's tournament series in 2019 was not without controversy, with the likes of Virat Kohli criticising the England and Wales Cricket Board for pursuing a shift away from Test cricket, while others argued the format should have followed the established and successful Twenty20 format. The ECB however decided it needed a more unique format to draw crowds.

In August 2019 the side announced that former Australian batsman Darren Lehmann would be the men's team's first coach, while former England Women player Danielle Hazell was appointed coach of the Women's team.

The inaugural Hundred draft took place in October 2019 and saw the Superchargers claim Ben Stokes as their headline men's draftee, and Lauren Winfield-Hill as the women's headliner. They are joined by England internationals Adil Rashid and David Willey for the men's team, while Linsey Smith joins Winfield-Hill in the women's side.

Honours

Men's honours 

The Hundred
5th place: 2021 (highest finish)

Women's honours 

The Hundred
5th place: 2022 (highest finish)

Ground 

Both the Northern Superchargers men's and women's sides will play at the home of Yorkshire, Headingley Cricket Ground, in the Headingley area of Leeds. The women's side had originally intended to play matches at York Cricket Club and South Northumberland Cricket Club but both teams were brought together at the same ground following the Covid-19 pandemic.

Players

Current squad

Men's side 
 Bold denotes players with international caps.
  denotes a player who is unavailable for rest of the season.

Men's captains
 Italics denote a temporary captain when the main captain was unavailable.

Women's side 
 Bold denotes players with international caps.
  denotes a player who is unavailable for rest of the season.

Women's captains
 Italics denote a temporary captain when the main captain was unavailable.

Seasons

Group stages

See also 

 List of Northern Superchargers cricketers
 List of cricket grounds in England and Wales
 List of Test cricket grounds

References

Further reading 

 BBC: The Hundred player draft – covering the first draft signings for each region's team

External links 

 Official web page

Yorkshire County Cricket Club
Northumberland County Cricket Club
Cricket in Yorkshire
Cricket in Northumberland
Sport in Leeds
Sport in York
Sport in Northumberland
The Hundred (cricket) teams
2019 establishments in England
Northern Superchargers